Ramayapalem may refer to either of two villages in Prakasam district of Andhra Pradesh state, India:

 Ramayapalem, Marripudi, in Marripudi mandal
 Ramayapalem, Peda Araveedu, in Peda Araveedu mandal